Laetiporus caribensis is a species of polypore fungus in the family Fomitopsidaceae. It is found in the Caribbean Islands and in Central America, where it causes a brown rot on tropical hardwood trees. It was described as new to science in 2012 by Mark Banik and Daniel Lindner. The type collection was made in El Yunque National Forest, Puerto Rico, where the fungus was found fruiting on a snag of Guarea guidonia.

References

Fungi described in 2012
Fungi of Central America
Fungi of Oceania
Fungal plant pathogens and diseases
caribensis
Fungi without expected TNC conservation status